Acanthophila silvestrella is a moth in the family Gelechiidae. It is found in Russia, where it is known only from the southern part of Primorsky Krai.

The wingspan is 11–12 mm. The forewings are greyish-brown with three dark dots on the cell and at the anal fold, as well as a twice broken light-grey transverse fascia, which is indistinct at its middle. The hindwings are grey.

References

Acanthophila
Moths described in 1998
Moths of Asia